"Chain My Heart" is a song by German producer Topic and American singer Bebe Rexha. It was released as a single on 11 June 2021 by Virgin Records.

Background
Topic said in an interview with Popjuice that he began working on the track in summer 2020 in Stockholm with A7S, before sending it to Rexha, who started working on it remotely.

Content
Rexha said in a statement, "'Chain My Heart' is about finding somebody that truly captivates your heart, and not wanting to let them go."

Music video
The official music video was uploaded on 13 July 2021, and it was directed by Jason Lester. It shows Topic and Rexha with a group of "leather-clad dancers" through an industrial Los Angeles location. The video was also noted to feature a "nod to 80s videos and action films and a wink to Berlin nightlife".

Charts

Weekly charts

Year-end charts

Release history

References

2021 songs
2021 singles
Topic (DJ) songs
Bebe Rexha songs
Songs written by Topic (DJ)
Songs written by Bebe Rexha
Songs written by A7S